Eso Won Books, an independent bookstore located at 4327 Degnan Boulevard in the Historic Leimert Park Village neighborhood of South Los Angeles, is one of the largest Black-owned bookstores in the U.S. In 2021, Publishers Weekly awarded the business Bookstore of the Year.

Description 
Eso Won Books is an 1,800-sq-ft bookstore with an inventory mix of African American classic and contemporary titles, including a children’s section. The bookstore regularly hosts author events and community gatherings.

History 
Eso Won Books started in the summer of 1988 in Los Angeles. Eso Won, which means “water over rocks” in the Ethiopian Amharic language, was originally named Eso Won Books on Wheels.

James Fugate and Tom Hamilton, founders and co-owners, said their goal was to sell books at community events, such as the L.A. Times Book Fair, and be “seen as not just a Black bookstore for Black people, but a Los Angeles bookstore in which everyone is welcome.”

Eso Won Books has hosted author signings with Muhammad Ali and his biographer Howard Bingham, historian Yosef AA ben-Jochannan, Octavia Butler, John Henrik Clarke, Johnnie L. Cochran, Jr., poet Nikki Giovanni, Berry Gordy, Jr., Patti LaBelle, Wynton Marsalis, Gloria Naylor, Sonia Sanchez, Kwame Toure (Stokely Carmichal), and Alice Walker.

Recognition
Ta-Nehisi Coates, the author of “Between the World and Me” remarked in one interview that Eso Won Books is "my favorite bookstore" and was also on his first book tour.

In popular culture
 Issa Rae's Insecure tv series season 3 (2018), episode "Fresh-Like" includes a scene in Leimert Park outside Eso Won Books.
 Casanegra: A Tennyson Hardwick Story, a 2007 mystery novel by actor Blair Underwood and writers Tananarive Due and Steven Barnes, includes mentions of recognizable Los Angeles features such as the restaurant chain Roscoe's House of Chicken and Waffles and Eso Won Books.

See also
 Books in the United States
 African American Bookstores

References

External links 

 
 Issa Rae's Favorite Black-owned Bookstore in Los Angeles – 4 minute interview by author and actress Issa Rae with Eso Won owner James Fugate, 16 October 2020.
 President Barack Obama visits James Fugate and Tom Hamilton of Eso Won Books in Los Angeles, CA - 7 minute interview by President Obama with the Eso Won Books owners, 23 April 2021.

Bookstores in California
Independent bookstores of the United States
Book selling websites
Bookstores established in the 20th century
Online retailers of the United States
American companies established in 1988
Retail companies established in 1988
Black-owned companies of the United States
Companies_based_in_Los_Angeles